Bruceiella laevigata is a species of sea snail, a marine gastropod mollusk in the family Skeneidae.

Description
The height of the shell attains 1.7 mm, its diameter 1.5 mm.

Distribution
This marine species was found off the Chatham Islands, New Zealand, at a depth of 1242 metres

References

 Marshall, B.A. 1994: Deep-sea gastropods from the New Zealand region associated with Recent whale bones and an Eocene turtle. The Nautilus 108: 1-8 (p. 5)

External links
 To World Register of Marine Species

laevigata
Gastropods described in 1994